José Antonio Echeverría (July 16, 1932 in Cárdenas, Matanzas – March 13, 1957 in Havana, Cuba) was a Cuban revolutionary and student leader. 
The President of the Federation of University Students (Federación Estudiantil Universitaria - FEU), he was a founding member of the Directorio Revolucionario Estudantil (DRE), a militant organization that played an important role in the Cuban Revolution to oust President Fulgencio Batista. He had the nickname "Manzanita", ("Little Apple"}. He was part of the Presidential Palace attack. Echeverría took a leading role in the attack on the Radio Reloj station attack that lead to his death.  Born to a middle-class family in Cárdenas, Echeverría enrolled at the University of Havana in order to study architecture.

José Antonio Jesús del Carmen Echeverría Bianchi was the first son of the marriage formed by Antonio Jesús Echeverría González and Concepción Bianchi Tristán; he had three younger siblings: Sinforiano, Alfredo and Lucía. He studied at the Champagnat primary school, belonging to the Congregation of the Marist Brothers, and later at the Secondary Education Institute of Cárdenas, where he graduated with a Bachelor of Science in 1950. 

On August 22, 1950, he enrolled in the School of Architecture at the University of Havana, a career he chose for his love of mathematics and drawing. In the capital he lived in several guest houses, private homes that rented rooms at affordable prices for students and people from the interior of the country.

On March 10, 1952, while on vacation in Cárdenas, he learned of the coup led by Fulgencio Batista. He immediately returned to Havana and joined the student protests against the coup. On 14 March 1952, Echeverría signed the Declaration of Principles of the University Student Federation.

On September 30, 1954, Echeverría became president of the FEU (University Student Federation) when the vice president resigned and the acting president, Benigno Arbezú, graduated. From this office, Echeverría strengthened and developed the student fight against the dictatorship and promoted solidarity with the economic problems of Latin America and support for their social and political struggles. During his presidency, he also promoted cultural life on the University campus, with the celebration of the University Symphony Week and exhibitions by important artists such as Wilfredo Lam and Girona. He organised cycles of conferences, performances by the Alicia Alonso Ballet and presentations by the Philharmonic Orchestra of Havana and the University Theatre.

After the takeover of the Radio Reloj station, Echeverría went to the University of Havana. The car in which he was travelling was intercepted by a police vehicle on the side of the university campus and Echeverría was shot and killed.

To avoid a public burial and mass demonstration, the Batista regime kept Echeverría's body in the morgue until the afternoon of 14 March. The body was then handed over to Echeverría's family, who had been in Havana since the day of Echeverría's death. Around six in the afternoon, the family authorized the transfer of the coffin to Cárdenas, with two conditions. Firstly, only the parents' car could accompany the hearse. The rest of the procession was to leave immediately and wait on the Calzada de Managua. The second condition was that the coffin would be taken directly to the Cementerio de Cárdenas.

Three Minutes of Truth
 Echeverría and his colleagues took part in an attack on the Havana Presidential Palace and the National Radio Station of Cuba on 13 March 1957. At the time of the attack, the station was broadcasting a music programme to which most of the people of Havana listened. Echeverría's anti-Batista speech would therefore be broadcast to the Cuban nation. Echeverría estimated that the rioters could only occupy the radio station for three minutes, so he had to prepare a speech that lasted three minutes at most. Echeverría managed to finish his speech at the 181st second. He left the station unharmed and, on the way to the University of Havana, just a few blocks away, he opened fire on a police patrol. He was killed during the shoot-out on the footpath of the north side of the university, where a memorial plaque now stands. Echeverría's speech was mentioned in the poem "Three Minutes of Truth" written by the Soviet-Russian poet Yevgeny Yevtushenko. The Vietnamese writer Phùng Quán also wrote a short story with the same name about Echeverría's speech, and commented:

See also
Directorio Revolucionario Estudiantil
Havana Presidential Palace attack (1957)
Radiocentro CMQ Building
Humboldt 7 massacre
Museum of the Revolution (Cuba)
Faure Chomón
Eloy Gutiérrez Menoyo
Rolando Cubela Secades

References

Gallery

Bibliography

External links
Cuando los universitarios se levantaron contra el gobernante de Cuba (FOTOS)
Revolt in Havana. Chicago Daily Tribune. March 14, 1957.]
No Eran Estudiantes los Que Atacaron el Palacio.

1932 births
1957 deaths
People from Matanzas Province
Cuban communists
Cuban soldiers
Cuban revolutionaries
Cuban people of Spanish descent
Cuban people of Basque descent
People of the Cuban Revolution
People shot dead by law enforcement officers
Deaths by firearm in Cuba